Amoria hunteri, common name Hunter's marbled volute, is a species of sea snail, a marine gastropod mollusk in the family Volutidae, the volutes.

Description
Amoria hunteri is the species with the largest shell in the genus Amoria. The length varies between 90 mm and 190 mm. It is solid and fusiform. The colour pattern is quite variable, the base colour may be white, yellowish or pink. It has a very glossy marbled surface, with reddish or brown zig-zag bands, a small, smooth and pointed conical protoconch and an elongate aperture.

Distribution
This marine species occurs in deep waters off East Australia.

References

 
 Bail P. & Limpus A. (2001) The genus Amoria. In: G.T. Poppe & K. Groh (eds) A conchological iconography. Hackenheim: Conchbooks. 50 pp., 93 pls.
 Bail, P & Poppe, G. T. 2001. A conchological iconography: a taxonomic introduction of the recent Volutidae. Hackenheim-Conchbook, 30 pp, 5 pl.
 Bail P. & Limpus A. (2011) Revision of the subgenus Amoria (Cymbiolista) Iredale, 1929 (Gastropoda: Volutidae). Visaya 3(3): 4–21

External links
 

Volutidae
Gastropods described in 1931